Gelantipy is a rural locality 49 km. north of Buchan in the East Gippsland region of Australia. There are also two adjoining parishes, Gelantipy East and Gelantipy West, that cover portions of the locality. Wulgulmerang, W Tree and Brumby localities are nearby.

Mount Gelantipy, notable for its old growth alpine ash forests is 12 km. east within the Snowy River National Park .

The Karoonda Park hostel on Gelantipy Road includes a local bus stop and petrol service. The Gelantipy Cemetery, Public Hall and Reserve are several kilometres south, alongside Butchers Creek.

History
The traditional owners of the lands that are now called Gelantipy are the Gunai people.

The Scot Edward Bayliss established the Gelantipy pastoral run in 1839 for his employer Edward Lord, a merchant.

Gelantipy was a mining area in addition to timber milling and livestock production.  The East Gippsland Shire Thematic Environmental History (2005) says:

"Traces of silver and lead were found as early as 1857 in the Buchan district. Over the ensuing years, a number of companies mined in the area, around Back Creek, Murrindal, Mt Tara, Canni Creek, Gelantipy and Mt Deddick areas. The government provided a battery but most mining ceased by 1907. Little remains to mark the sites of these mines. …At the Campbells Knob Mine near Gelantipy, where silver was mined in the 1890s, two mine adits are visible but no trace remains of the small settlement near the mine."

The history also records that there was a sawmill at Gelantipy in the period after World War Two. This was operated by Gibbs Bright & Co.

Bushfires affected the region in 1952, 2003 and 2014. In 2018 an upgraded CFA fire station was opened next to the district Bush Nursing Centre.

Frank Moon, who developed the Buchan Caves for tourism in the early 1900s, was born in Gelantipy.

Seldom Seen roadhouse

Seldom Seen is a remote locality in the Victorian high country, just north of Gelantipy and close to the Snowy River.

The Seldom Seen Roadhouse was located near 5373 Gelantipy Road, Wulgulmerang East, about 30 km. from the NSW border.

Between Buchan in Victoria and Jindabyne in New South Wales,
 the Seldom Seen Roadhouse was the only place for fuel along the Snowy. "Mobil" Dave Woodburn was the owner.

The owner relied on the small tourist trade during the 1990s and 2000s. Before the alpine bushfires of 2003,  Seldom Seen Roadhouse was a typical 1960s-era petrol station. By March 2005, the roadhouse was trading from a caravan, which was then replaced with a more permanent structure.

Unfortunately that trade was steadily diminishing. A few tourist buses from Melbourne would make the trip through Seldom Seen daily.  This bus route also stopped around 2010. Dave Woodburn died in 2012, and since then the area has been cleared; all that remains is a hut and a Telstra payphone.

Climate

References

Towns in Victoria (Australia)
Shire of East Gippsland